Alejandra Barros (born Alejandra Barros del Campo on August 11, 1971) is a Mexican actress. She is best known for her role in Televisa's telenovela Mariana de la Noche (2003).

Biography 
Barros studied in New York in The Lee Strasberg Theater Institute to study acting; she later transferred over to Actors Studio Film & T.V  School where she studied film and television, and in the Broadway Dance Center, tap and jazz. After living a couple of years in New York City, Barros moved back to Mexico City and enrolled in an acting school to brush-up her acting skills.

After having studied acting and film, Barros received her first opportunity to act in the telenovela Huracán, sharing credits with Alejandro Camacho and Rebecca Jones. She later came to act in telenovelas such as  Locura de Amor, a production led by Roberto Gómez Fernández.

Her first stage role was Malcom y su lucha contra los Eunucos, by director Alejandro Bichir, presented at the festival of theater in Málaga, Spain. Other stage work includes the Mexican adaptation of Patrick Marber's play, Closer alongside Bruno Bichir. In 2009/2010, Barros co-starred with Tony Dalton in Bernard Slade's Same Time Next Year.

After working in Mexican television for several years, Barros was given her first starring role in the 2003 telenovela Mariana de la Noche where she essayed the title character with Jorge Salinas as her leading man. In 2006, Barros co-starred in the Mexican telenovela remake of 1986's El Camino Secreto, now titled La Verdad Oculta opposite Eduardo Yáñez. Both versions were written by Jose Rendon. In 2008/2009, she appeared with Alejandro Camacho in Alma de Hierro. She teamed up with Camacho and Jones once again in 2010's critically acclaimed Para Volver a Amar by Gómez Fernández and Giselle González, where she portrayed Bárbara Mantilla, the suffering, yet flighty and carefree wife of an abusive alcoholic. For her efforts, Barros won the award for Best Actress in a Co-Starring Role given by Revista TV y Novelas in their annual Premios gala on March 6, 2011.

Also in 2010, Alejandra Barros co-starred with Eugenio Derbez in the romantic comedy No Eres Tu, Soy Yo which went on to become one of the highest-grossing films in Mexican cinema history.

In 2013, Alejandra Barros acted in Carlos Moreno Laguillo's telenovela: Quiero Amarte. A year later, she joined the production of Mapat Lopez Zatarain in La sombra del pasado, giving life to the main antagonist Candela Rivero de Mendoza. In 2015, she joined the production of Carlos Moreno Laguillo's A que no me dejas, again as the main antagonist Julieta Olmedo Rodriguez de Cordova.

In 2016, she won the lead role in the series Mujeres de negro.

Filmography

Awards and nominations

References

External links

Alejandra Barros at the Telenovela Database

1971 births
Living people
Mexican telenovela actresses
Mexican television actresses
Mexican film actresses
Mexican stage actresses
Actresses from Mexico City
20th-century Mexican actresses
21st-century Mexican actresses
People from Mexico City